In mathematics, the positive part of a real or extended real-valued function is defined by the formula

Similarly, the negative part of f is defined as 

Note that both f+ and f− are non-negative functions. A peculiarity of terminology is that the 'negative part' is neither negative nor a part (like the imaginary part of a complex number is neither imaginary nor a part).

The function f can be expressed in terms of f+ and f− as

Also note that

.

Using these two equations one may express the positive and negative parts as

Another representation, using the Iverson bracket is

One may define the positive and negative part of any function with values in a linearly ordered group.

The unit ramp function is the positive part of the identity function.

Measure-theoretic properties
Given a measurable space (X,Σ), an extended real-valued function f is measurable if and only if its positive and negative parts are. Therefore, if such a function f is measurable, so is its absolute value |f|, being the sum of two measurable functions. The converse, though, does not necessarily hold: for example, taking f as

where V is a Vitali set, it is clear that f is not measurable, but its absolute value is, being a constant function.

The positive part and negative part of a function are used to define the Lebesgue integral for a real-valued function. Analogously to this decomposition of a function, one may decompose a signed measure into positive and negative parts — see the Hahn decomposition theorem.

See also
 Rectifier (neural networks)
Even and odd functions
Real and imaginary parts

References

External links
 Positive part on MathWorld

Elementary mathematics